Colley Gate is an area within Cradley and also a road in Cradley in Halesowen, England. Colley Gate is the name of the road between Windmill Hill and Greenways part of the A458 road connecting Halesowen with Stourbridge. Graham Hill is the current Mayor.

Areas of the West Midlands (county)
Halesowen